This is a listing of Edward Woore's major works, listed where possible in date order.

Background
Edward Woore (1880–1960) was a stained glass artist and part of a group of artists trained by Christopher Whall, a leading figure in the Arts and Crafts Movement.  Fellow apprentices included Louis Davis and Karl Parsons. Together with Parsons he helped illustrate Whall's book " Stained Glass Work" in 1905.

He was a close friend and fellow apprentice of Arnold Robinson, who took over the stained glass company of Joseph Bell and Sons in Bristol and for which Woore often undertook commissions. He later managed Whall's studio for a short time before Whall's death and also collaborated with Whall's daughter Veronica.  For a time he had had his own studio in Hammersmith and from 1924 to 1941 did so again in Putney, where he lived at 66 Deodar Road, the same road as so many of Whall's followers.

Works in cathedrals and parish churches

Other work

 There is a work by Woore in the Stained Glass Museum at Ely. It depicts Jesus with Joseph and Mary in Joseph's carpenter's shop. The window was designed by Edward Woore and made by Joseph Bell and Son. It is entitled: "Christ in the Carpenter's Shop"
 Two chancel windows in St Peter, Westleton, Suffolk are attributed to Woore. The two-light window on the south side represents St Felix & St George and is a memorial to three members of the local Deck family who were killed in WWII 
 In the volume of "The Buildings of England" "Somerset" by Andrew Foyle, the author states that the Chigi Memorial window in St Margaret's Church, Queen Charlton, Somerset which was made by Bell and Son was probably designed by Woore.
 The Bembridge School chapel in Bembridge, Isle of Wight contains a window by Woore.  Bembridge School closed in 1997 and the site is now occupied by Ryde School with Upper Chine but the chapel which is Grade IIGV listed has been retained.
 Woore also executed two windows for St Luke's Church in Havelock North, New Zealand in 1928.  The first depicts the Annunciation: The Angel Gabriel tells the Virgin Mary that she is to bear the child Jesus. She carries lilies which symbolize virginity and purity. The second window depicts the Nativity: Mary is depicted with the baby Jesus in the Bethlehem stable. Below are some images of these windows shown courtesy Thea and Roeland Kloppenburg. Thea is the Parish Administrator and Roeland, who took the photographs, is her son

Gallery

References 

Woore, Edward